Skylark Field  is a city-owned, public-use airport located three nautical miles (6 km) east of the central business district of Killeen, a city in Bell County, Texas, United States. It is included in the National Plan of Integrated Airport Systems for 2011–2015, which categorized it as a general aviation facility. It was formerly known as Killeen Municipal Airport.

The airport does not currently offer scheduled passenger service on commercial airlines. Atlantic Southeast Airlines, operating as Delta Connection, served this airport until August 2003, when it replaced its turboprop airplanes with regional jets which required a longer runway. In August 2004, the City of Killeen relocated the remaining airlines from Killeen Municipal Airport to new facilities at the Killeen-Fort Hood Regional Airport, which has a longer runway to accommodate larger jets and an expanded terminal to handle more passengers.

Facilities and aircraft 
Skylark Field covers an area of 180 acres (73 ha) at an elevation of 848 feet (258 m) above mean sea level. It has one runway designated 1/19 with an asphalt surface measuring 5,495 by 100 feet (1,675 x 30 m).

For the 12-month period ending August 20, 2010, the airport had 29,700 aircraft operations, an average of 81 per day: 87% general aviation and 13% military. At that time there were 55 aircraft based at this airport: 91% single-engine, 4% multi-engine, and 5% helicopter.

References

External links 
 Skylark Field
  at Texas DOT Airport Directory
 Aerial image as of January 1996 from USGS The National Map
 

Airports in Texas
Transportation in Bell County, Texas
Buildings and structures in Bell County, Texas